In mathematics, the Weierstrass transform of a function , named after Karl Weierstrass, is a "smoothed" version of  obtained by averaging the values of , weighted with a Gaussian centered at x.

Specifically, it is the function  defined by

 
The factor 1/√(4π) is chosen so that the Gaussian will have a total integral of 1, with the consequence that constant functions are not changed by the Weierstrass transform.

Instead of   one also writes . Note that  need not exist for every real number , when the defining integral fails to converge.

The Weierstrass transform is intimately related to the heat equation (or, equivalently, the diffusion equation with constant diffusion coefficient).

The generalized Weierstrass transform provides a means to approximate a given integrable function  arbitrarily well with analytic functions.

Names
Weierstrass used this transform in his original proof of the Weierstrass approximation theorem. It is also known as the Gauss transform or Gauss–Weierstrass transform after Carl Friedrich Gauss and as the Hille transform after Einar Carl Hille who studied it extensively. The generalization Wt mentioned below is known in signal analysis as a Gaussian filter and in image processing (when implemented on R2) as a Gaussian blur.

Transforms of some important functions
As mentioned above, every constant function is its own Weierstrass transform. The Weierstrass transform of any polynomial is a polynomial of the same degree, and in fact same leading coefficient (the asymptotic growth is unchanged). Indeed, if  denotes the (physicist's) Hermite polynomial of degree n, then the Weierstrass transform of (/2) is simply . This can be shown by exploiting the fact that the generating function for the Hermite polynomials is closely related to the Gaussian kernel used in the definition of the Weierstrass transform.

The Weierstrass transform of the function eax (where a is an arbitrary constant) is ea2 eax. The function  eax is thus an eigenfunction of the Weierstrass transform. (This is, in fact, more generally true for all convolution transforms.)

Setting a=bi where i is the imaginary unit, and applying Euler's identity, one sees that the Weierstrass transform of the function cos(bx) is e−b2 cos(bx) and the Weierstrass transform of the function sin(bx) is e−b2 sin(bx).

The Weierstrass transform of the function eax2 is 
       if a < 1/4 and undefined if a ≥ 1/4.

In particular, by choosing a negative, it is evident that the Weierstrass transform of a Gaussian function is again a Gaussian function, but a "wider" one.

General properties
The Weierstrass transform assigns to each function f a new function F; this assignment is linear. It is also translation-invariant, meaning that the transform of the function f(x + a) is F(x + a). Both of these facts are more generally true for any integral transform defined via convolution.

If the transform F(x) exists for the real numbers x = a and x = b, then it also exists for all real values in between and forms an analytic function there; moreover, F(x) will exist for all complex values of x with a ≤ Re(x) ≤ b and forms a holomorphic function on that strip of the complex plane. This is the formal statement of the "smoothness" of F mentioned above.

If f is integrable over the whole real axis (i.e. f ∈ L1(R)), then so is its Weierstrass transform F, and if furthermore f(x) ≥ 0 for all x, then also F(x) ≥ 0 for all x and the integrals of f and F are equal. This expresses the physical fact that the total thermal energy or heat is conserved by the heat equation, or that the total amount of diffusing material is conserved by the diffusion equation.

Using the above, one can show that for 0 < p ≤ ∞ and f ∈ Lp(R), we have F ∈ Lp(R) and ||F||p ≤ ||f||p. The Weierstrass transform consequently yields a bounded operator W : Lp(R) → Lp(R).

If f is sufficiently smooth, then the Weierstrass transform of the k-th derivative of f is equal to the k-th derivative of the Weierstrass transform of f.

There is a formula relating the Weierstrass transform W and the two-sided Laplace transform L. If we define

then

Low-pass filter 

We have seen above that the Weierstrass transform of cos(bx) is e−b2 cos(bx), and analogously for sin(bx). In terms of signal analysis, this suggests that if the signal f contains the frequency b (i.e. contains a summand which is a combination of sin(bx) and cos(bx)), then the transformed signal F will contain the same frequency, but with an amplitude multiplied by the factor e−b2. This has the consequence that higher frequencies are reduced more than lower ones, and the Weierstrass transform thus acts as a low-pass filter. This can also be shown with the continuous Fourier transform, as follows. The Fourier transform analyzes a signal in terms of its frequencies, transforms convolutions into products, and transforms Gaussians into Gaussians. The Weierstrass transform is convolution with a Gaussian and is therefore multiplication of the Fourier transformed signal with a Gaussian, followed by application of the inverse Fourier transform. This multiplication with a Gaussian in frequency space blends out high frequencies, which is another way of describing the "smoothing" property of the Weierstrass transform.

The inverse transform
The following formula, closely related to the Laplace transform of a Gaussian function, and a real analogue to the Hubbard–Stratonovich transformation, is relatively easy to establish:

Now replace u with the formal differentiation operator D = d/dx and utilize the Lagrange shift operator  
, 
(a consequence of the Taylor series formula and the definition of the exponential function), to obtain

to thus obtain the following formal expression for the Weierstrass transform W,

where the operator on the right is to be understood as acting on the function f(x)  as

The above formal derivation glosses over details of convergence, and the formula W = eD2 is thus not universally valid; there are several functions f which have a well-defined Weierstrass transform, but for which eD2f(x) cannot be meaningfully defined.

Nevertheless, the rule is still quite useful and can, for example, be used to derive the Weierstrass transforms of polynomials, exponential and trigonometric functions mentioned above.

The formal inverse of the Weierstrass transform is thus given by

Again, this formula is not universally valid but can serve as a guide. It can be shown to be correct for certain classes of functions if the right-hand side operator is properly defined.

One may, alternatively,  attempt to invert the Weierstrass transform in a slightly different way: given the analytic function

apply W−1 to obtain

once more using a fundamental property of the (physicists') Hermite polynomials .

Again, this formula for f(x) is at best formal, since one didn't check whether the final series converges. But if, for instance, f ∈ L2(R), then knowledge of all the derivatives of F at x = 0 suffices to yield the coefficients an; and to thus reconstruct  as a series of Hermite polynomials.

A third method of inverting the Weierstrass transform exploits its connection to the Laplace transform mentioned above, and the well-known inversion formula for the Laplace transform. The result is stated below for distributions.

Generalizations

The larger , the more this operator averages out and changes . Physically,  corresponds to following the heat (or diffusion) equation for  time units, and this is additive, 
 
corresponding to "diffusing for  time units, then  time units, is equivalent to diffusing for  time units".

 can be computed from : given a function , define a new function ; then , a consequence of the substitution rule.

The Weierstrass transform can also be defined for certain classes of distributions or "generalized functions". For example, the Weierstrass transform of the Dirac delta is the Gaussian .

In this context, rigorous inversion formulas can be proved, e.g.,

where  is any fixed real number for which  exists, the integral extends over the vertical line in the complex plane with real part , and the limit is to be taken in the sense of distributions.

More generally, the Weierstrass transform can be defined on any Riemannian manifold: the heat equation can be formulated there (using the manifold's Laplace–Beltrami operator), and the Weierstrass transform  is then given by following the solution of the heat equation for one time unit, starting with the initial "temperature distribution" .

Related transforms
If one considers convolution with the kernel   instead of with a Gaussian, one obtains the Poisson transform which smoothes and averages a given function in a manner similar to the Weierstrass transform.

See also 
 Gaussian blur
 Gaussian filter
 Husimi Q representation
 Heat equation#Fundamental solutions

References

Integral transforms
Mathematical physics